Keidel is a German surname. Notable people with the surname include:
 Ralf Keidel (born 1977), German football coach and former player
 Wilhelm Victor Keidel (1825–1870), physicians from Texas

German-language surnames
Surnames from nicknames